The Star Theatre is a historic two-story building in Price, Utah. It was built in 1923-1924 for five brothers who were immigrants from Greece: Pete, Angelo, Charlie, George and Harry Georgedes. The building was designed in the Classical Revival style by architect J.A. Headlund, an immigrant from Sweden, with "fluted pilasters with Corinthian capitals; bands of round arch windows; an elaborate entablature with modillions on the cornice; egg and dart molding and dentils on the frieze and an architrave; and a parapet.". It has been listed on the National Register of Historic Places since August 9, 1982.

References

National Register of Historic Places in Carbon County, Utah
Neoclassical architecture in Utah
Theatres completed in 1923
1923 establishments in Utah